The 3rd New Brunswick Legislative Assembly represented New Brunswick between February 9, 1796, and 1802.

The assembly sat at the pleasure of the Governor of New Brunswick Thomas Carleton. Construction of a building to house the assembly at Fredericton, Province Hall, began in 1799 and was completed in 1802.

Amos Botsford was chosen as speaker for the house.

History

Members

References 

Journal of the votes and proceedings of the House of Assembly of ... New-Brunswick from ... February to ... March, 1796 (1796)

03
1796 in Canada
1797 in Canada
1798 in Canada
1799 in Canada
1800 in Canada
1801 in Canada
1802 in Canada
1795 establishments in New Brunswick
1802 disestablishments in New Brunswick